The 1975–76 Minnesota Fighting Saints season was the original Minnesota Fighting Saints' fourth and final season of operation in the World Hockey Association (WHA). The Saints did not finish the season, folding after 59 games. However the
1975–76 Cleveland Crusaders would relocate to Minnesota the following season and play as the new Fighting Saints.

Offseason

Regular season

Final standings

Game log

Playoffs

Player stats

Note: Pos = Position; GP = Games played; G = Goals; A = Assists; Pts = Points; +/- = plus/minus; PIM = Penalty minutes; PPG = Power-play goals; SHG = Short-handed goals; GWG = Game-winning goals
      MIN = Minutes played; W = Wins; L = Losses; T = Ties; GA = Goals-against; GAA = Goals-against average; SO = Shutouts;

Awards and records

Transactions

Draft picks
Minnesota's draft picks at the 1975 WHA Amateur Draft.

Farm teams

See also
1975–76 WHA season

References

External links

Minnesota Fighting Saints seasons
Minn
Minn